Bruce Buchanan (born 1958 or 1959) is a Canadian retired sportscaster. He was the play-by-play announcer for the Edmonton Oilers television broadcasts on ITV, CKEM, and Sportsnet West from 1984 until 2001 with analyst John Garrett. During the 1986–87 season, he split play-by-play duties on CHCH-TV's Toronto Maple Leafs broadcasts with Calgary Flames announcer Peter Maher. He has also done play-by-play for the Red Deer Rebels, Winnipeg Jets and Calgary Flames and got occasional play-by-play assignments on Hockey Night in Canada in the late 1980s. Buchanan later worked for Sportsnet, and as a sports anchor for A-Channel in Edmonton. As of 2005, he was working as a real estate agent.

References

Living people
1950s births
Canadian sports announcers
Calgary Flames announcers
Edmonton Oilers announcers
People from Brandon, Manitoba
Toronto Maple Leafs announcers
Winnipeg Jets announcers
North American Soccer League (1968–1984) commentators